Alonzo Russell may refer to:
 Alonzo Russell (sprinter)
 Alonzo Russell (American football)